Zetlitz is a given name. Notable people with the name include:

Axel Christian Zetlitz Kielland (1853–1924), Norwegian civil servant and diplomat
Bertine Zetlitz (born 1975), Norwegian pop singer
Christian Zetlitz Bretteville (1800–1871), Norwegian politician
Henrik Andreas Zetlitz Lassen (born 1818), Norwegian politician
Jens Zetlitz (1761–1821), Norwegian priest and poet
Jens Zetlitz Kielland (1816–1881), Norwegian consul and artist
Jens Zetlitz Monrad Kielland (1866–1926), Norwegian architect

Norwegian-language surnames